Cloud Ten Pictures is a Canadian film production and distribution company located in St. Catharines, Ontario, Canada that specialized in producing "end times" Christian films.

Overview 

Cloud Ten was formed by brothers Peter LaLonde and Paul LaLonde in 1994. The Lalonde brothers self-financed the company's early films, which consisted primarily of a series of documentaries relating to Christian theological issues. Prior to forming Cloud Ten, the LaLonde brothers had found an  audience in Christian Evangelical circles through their television program, This Week in Bible Prophecy.

The company's first feature film was Apocalypse (film) (1998), a low-budget thriller. The company has since produced three more films in the Apocalypse Series, Revelation (1999), Tribulation (2000) and Judgment (2001).

In 2000, Cloud Ten Pictures released Left Behind: The Movie, based upon the first book in the popular Left Behind book series, authored by Tim LaHaye and Jerry Jenkins.  Released into the video market on October 31, Left Behind: The Movie became one of the highest grossing videos of the year. .  Byron M. Jones the then VP of Entertainment said this "Already, the pre-orders for this sequel have outpaced those of the original LEFT BEHIND movie by almost 40%. It also ended up being named the `Best-Selling Title of the Year by an Independent Studio".  Cloud Ten also produced two sequels based upon the second book in the Left Behind book series, Left Behind: Tribulation Force (2002) and Left Behind: World at War (2005).  Cloud Ten released Left Behind: World at War via a coordinated nationwide screening in over 3,200 churches (compared with a typical 1,700 screens in a nationwide theatrical release).  The World at War release started a trend for Christian film church releases, and led Cloud Ten to launching its Church Cinema program.  The marketing success of the Left Behind films generated significant publicity for the company and its founders, Peter and Paul Lalonde, who were referred to as "The Fabulous LaLonde Brothers" in a profile by GQ magazine.

Cloud Ten's success with the Left Behind films was marred by legal disputes with both their co-producers Namesake Entertainment and one of the authors of the popular book series, Tim LaHaye.  The dispute with LaHaye resulted in a series of legal actions, originally filed in 2000, which were finally settled in July 2008.  The terms of the settlement are confidential, but Cloud Ten Pictures has stated that Tim Lahaye has the rights for one year to try to remake the Left Behind films. If he does not exercise those rights within one year, Cloud Ten Pictures will again have the rights to make Left Behind movies.

As of October 1, 2010 the rights to the Left Behind film series have officially been restored to Cloud Ten Pictures, and the company is planning a remake of the series. Cloud Ten was hoping to start development on the remake by late 2011.

Cloud Ten released three films in 2008: Smuggler's Ransom, Genius Club and Saving God.  Both Smuggler's Ransom and Genius Club were acquired for distribution. Saving God is a co-production with Clear Entertainment, and stars Ving Rhames, Ricardo Chavira and Dean McDermott. They also distributed The River Within in 2009.

Movies

Documentaries
Left Behind Docudrama (1994/1996 recut)
Final Warning (1995)
Startling Proofs (1995)
Last Days: Hype or Hope? (1996)
The Mark of the Beast (1997)
Vanished (1999)
The Gospel of the Antichrist: Exposed
Racing to the End of Time (formerly: 2000 AD: Are You Ready?)
Shadow Government (2009)
Dragons or Dinosaurs? (2010)
12 Biggest Lies (2010)

Films

Abandoned projects
In 2003, the company started pre-production of a movie called End Game. The movie was supposed to be their first film planned to have a wide theatrical release. Eleven pages of the shooting script went up on the official website, but production came to a halt shortly after.

In mid-June 2003, production was supposed to begin on an animated remake of their film Left Behind: The Movie. Cloud Ten's VP of films André van Heerden said "the storyline will be even closer to the original books than a live-action movie can be simply because of the freedom animation gives." This film will not be made though.

Shortly after the release of Left Behind: World at War, a television show, based on Left Behind was in the planning stages for airing on the PAX television network. Planning for the television show went as far as casting calls in the United States and Canada, but creative differences on the direction the proposed television series should take, led Cloud Ten Pictures to abandon the project.

Defunct
Cloud Ten Pictures CEO Paul Lalonde opened the new Christian production company Stoney Lake Entertainment, which produced the Left Behind remake, a film that was originally going to be produced by Cloud Ten Pictures.

References

External links 
 Official Website

Defunct film and television production companies of Canada
Film production companies of Canada
Entertainment companies established in 1994
Christian film production companies